Yaw Kiti Glymin (born 22 July 1993) is an Australian rugby league footballer on the  position. He played for the St. George Illawarra Dragons in the National Rugby League.

Background
Glymin was born in Arncliffe, New South Wales and is of Ghanaian descent. He played his junior rugby league for the Arncliffe Scots, before being signed by the St. George Illawarra Dragons.

Playing career
Progressing through the St. George Illawarra Dragons Harold Matthews Cup and S. G. Ball Cup squads, Glymin played for the Dragons' NYC team in 2012 and 2013, before moving on to the Dragons' NSW Cup team, Illawarra Cutters in 2014. On 27 October 2014, he re-signed with St. George on a one-year contract.

In round 17 of the 2015 NRL season, Glymin made his debut for St. George against the North Queensland Cowboys. On 12 August 2015, he re-signed with St. George on a two-year contract.

Glymin was released by St. George at the end of 2017 after only making 1 appearance due to injuries.

References

External links
St. George Illawarra Dragons profile

1993 births
Australian rugby league players
Australian people of Ghanaian descent
St. George Illawarra Dragons players
Illawarra Cutters players
Rugby league wingers
Living people
Rugby league players from Sydney